David Gregory Malone (born October 19, 1948 in St. John's, Newfoundland) is a Canadian impressionist and actor. He is well known for the CODCO television series and his impersonations of Barbara Frum, Jean Chrétien, and Queen Elizabeth II.

Career 
Prior to CODCO, Malone wrote and performed in a number of shows for CBC Television, including The Wonderful Grand Band, The Root Seller and The S and M Comic Book, and appeared in the film The Adventure of Faustus Bidgood.

After the death of his CODCO co-star Tommy Sexton in 1993, he devoted some years of his life to raising awareness of HIV and AIDS, including writing, directing and appearing in a training film for health care professionals. He also directed a docudrama film, The Untold Story of the Suffragists of Newfoundland, in which he appeared as Sir Richard Squires, and acted in the films Rare Birds, Extraordinary Visitor, Messiah from Montreal and Heyday!. He also appeared in a one-man special for Comedy Now!, Pocket Queen, which won an award at the 1999 WorldFest-Houston International Film Festival. More recently, he has had a recurring guest role in Republic of Doyle. He appeared as orphanage headmaster Mr. Hill in the Irish-Canadian co-production Maudie, widely released in 2017.

Along with Sexton and their CODCO co-star Andy Jones, Malone was a recipient of the Earle Grey Award, the lifetime achievement award of Canadian television's Gemini Awards, in 2002.

His first memoir, You Better Watch Out, was published in 2009 by Knopf Canada.  He released a book in 2012 entitled Don't Tell the Newfoundlanders: The True Story of Newfoundland's Confederation with Canada, which is a look at how Newfoundland became a province of Canada in 1949. Malone is openly gay. He is also an amateur theologian.

Filmography

Films

TV

Politics
Malone participated in the campaign that stopped the privatization of Newfoundland and Labrador Hydro, and has championed other environmental causes, including a campaign to ban shipping of garbage to Newfoundland. He ran as a candidate for the New Democratic Party in the St. John's West by-election in 2000, losing narrowly to Loyola Hearn.

Malone supported Elizabeth May and the Green Party of Canada in the 2008 election, and performed at the 2009 Green Party convention in Pictou, Nova Scotia.

In June 2019, Malone was announced as the Green party candidate for the riding of Avalon for the 2019 federal election. Malone finished a distant fourth in the election.

Electoral record

References

External links
 

1948 births
Living people
Male actors from Newfoundland and Labrador
Canadian actor-politicians
Canadian memoirists
Canadian television personalities
Canadian gay actors
Gay politicians
Gay comedians
Canadian LGBT politicians
New Democratic Party candidates for the Canadian House of Commons
Green Party of Canada candidates in the 2019 Canadian federal election
Newfoundland and Labrador candidates for Member of Parliament
Writers from St. John's, Newfoundland and Labrador
Canadian male television actors
Canadian gay writers
Gay memoirists
Canadian sketch comedians
Comedians from Newfoundland and Labrador
Canadian LGBT comedians
21st-century Canadian LGBT people